Mombello Monferrato is a comune (municipality) in the Province of Alessandria in the Italian region Piedmont, located about  east of Turin and about  northwest of Alessandria.

References

External links
 Official website

Cities and towns in Piedmont